KLEM (1410 AM) is a radio station licensed to serve Le Mars, Iowa.  The station is owned by Powell Broadcasting Company, Inc.  It airs a classic hits music format.

The station was assigned these call letters by the Federal Communications Commission.

References

External links
KLEM official website

FCC History Cards for KLEM

LEM
Classic hits radio stations in the United States